Universal Records was a record label owned by Universal Music Group and operated as part of the Universal Motown Republic Group. The label has been dormant since 2006, due to Universal Motown and Universal Republic Records being formed and taking all of the artists from it. Those labels were eventually combined to form the latest iteration of Republic Records.

As of 2022, The label remains dormant but has been credited as a copyright-holder under a few present-day releases.

History
Founded in 1995 as Rising Tide Records, the label would ultimately begin to thrive the following year when its name was changed to Universal Records to complement the branding overhaul of the Universal Studios structure since MCA Inc. was purchased from Matsushita Electric by Seagram. The label, which is actually the second incarnation (the first one was a short-lived underground imprint of MCA Records that existed from 1988 to 1989) was created by former Universal Music Group chairman Doug Morris (who now heads Sony Music Entertainment) and Daniel Glass, who became its president.

Universal Records had success in breaking new artists, including the multi-platinum debut of Erykah Badu, Billie Myers, Goldfinger, Akon and the Lost Boyz. Glass formed relationships with independent record labels as Kedar Entertainment and Mojo Records.

New Orleans, Louisiana based record company Cash Money Records, led by Ronald "Slim" Williams and Bryan "Baby/Birdman" Williams, signed a three-year $30 million distribution deal with Universal Records in March 1998. Under the terms of the deal, the Williams were given a $3 million advance each year and a credit of $1.5 million for each of the up to six artists that they had at the time. After recouping, Universal Records would retain 15% of profits from album sales, while Cash Money retained 85% as well as ownership of all master recordings.  Cash Money's first success under Universal was Juvenile's November 1998 release, 400 Degreez. The album peaked at number 9 on the Billboard Top 200 and would ultimately go on to be certified quadruple platinum in the US. 

New York City, New York based Hip Hop and R&B record company Bad Boy Entertainment, founded by Sean "P. Diddy" Combs, signed a three-year marketing, promotion and distribution deal to Universal Records in February 2003. Univeral and Bad Boy released Bad Boy's Da Band's September 2003 album, Too Hot for TV. The album was ultimately certified Gold in America.  

The label had successes with acts like 3 Doors Down, 98 Degrees, Chamillionaire, Godsmack, Mushroomhead, Flaw, Hatebreed, Lifer, Jack Johnson, Juvenile, Nelly, Big Sha, Lil Wayne, and Mika. In 1999, Universal Records was pooled together with Motown Records and Republic Records to form Universal Motown Republic Group.

There have been unrelated Universal Records labels in Europe and the Philippines. Because of the unrelated label in the Philippines owning the rights to the Universal Records name in that country, parent company Universal Music Group does business there as MCA Music, Inc., using UMG's former name.

It was also the distributor of Polydor in the United States. Distribution switched to Interscope Geffen A&M and Republic Records after the label's dissolution.

Affiliated labels 
Affiliated labels included Celtic Heartbeat Records, co-founded by U2 manager Paul McGuinness. formerly affiliated with Atlantic Records, and Universal Motown Republic Group (UMRG). Bill Whelan's Riverdance was Celtic Heartbeat's first album to sell more than a million copies.

See also 
 Universal Records artists
 List of record labels

References

 
American record labels
Record labels based in California
Defunct record labels of the United States
Labels distributed by Universal Music Group
Contemporary R&B record labels
Heavy metal record labels
Hip hop record labels
Pop record labels
Rock record labels
Defunct companies based in Greater Los Angeles
Record labels established in 1995
Record labels disestablished in 2005
1995 establishments in California
2005 disestablishments in California
Universal Music Group